There are at least 10 members of the Mallow order, Malvales, found in Montana. Some of these species are introduced species, not native to Montana. and some species have been designated as Species of Concern.

Family: Malvaceae

Abutilon theophrasti, velvet-leaf
Alcea rosea, hollyhock
Hibiscus trionum, flower-of-an-hour
Iliamna rivularis, streambank globemallow
Malva moschata, musk cheeseweed
Malva neglecta, dwarf cheeseweed
Malva parviflora, small Whorled cheeseweed
Sidalcea oregana, Oregon checker-mallow
Sphaeralcea coccinea, scarlet globemallow
Sphaeralcea munroana, white-stemmed globemallow

Further reading

See also
 List of dicotyledons of Montana

Notes

Montana
Malvales
Malvale
Malvales